The Lenka Franulic Award is a Chilean prize, whose purpose is to recognize career achievement in women's journalism. It is named for Lenka Franulic, the first Chilean woman journalist.

Winners

See also

 List of media awards honoring women

References

1963 establishments in Chile
Awards established in 1963
Chilean awards
Journalism awards
Mass media awards honoring women